Racing Club Abidjan, known as RC Abidjan, is a football club based in Abidjan, Ivory Coast. Currently, the club plays in Ivory Coast's Ligue 1.

History 
Club was founded in 2006 as Cissé Institoute. In 2014 was bought FC Kokoumbo. Team in 2015/16 season won D3. In 2017 was changed name into Racing Club Abidjan. In 2017/18 season team won in Ligue 2 and was promoted to Top division. In 2018/19 season team was in 4 place.

In 2018, the club signed a partnership with French club OGC Nice.

Kit evolution 
 Team plays with blue shirts with white signs..

Current squad

References

External links 
 Official site
 Soccerway

Football clubs in Ivory Coast
Sport in Abidjan